is a colloquial term meaning good morning in Japanese.

Ohayo may also refer to:
 Good Morning (1959 film), 1959 Japanese comedy film by director Yasujirō Ozu
 Ohayo Mountain, Catskill Mountains, New York, US
 A misspelling of Ohio, a U.S. state

See also
 Ohayocon, anime convention
 Ohayō! Spank, manga and anime
 Ohio (disambiguation)
 Good Morning (disambiguation)